The Amiriyah shelter bombing was an aerial bombing attack that killed between 400-1,500 civilians on 13 February 1991 during the Persian Gulf War, when an air-raid shelter ("Public Shelter No. 25") in the Amiriyah neighborhood of Baghdad, Iraq, was destroyed by the U.S. Air Force with two GBU-27 Paveway III laser-guided "smart bombs".

The United States targeted the Amiriyah shelter. The U.S. Department of Defense stated that they "knew the Ameriyya facility had been used as a civil-defense shelter during the Iran–Iraq War", while the U.S. military stated they believed the shelter was no longer a civil defense shelter and that they thought it had been converted to a command center or a military personnel bunker. Human Rights Watch stated that "The United States' failure to give such a warning before proceeding with the disastrous attack on the Ameriyya shelter was a serious violation of the laws of war".

Background
The Amiriyah shelter was used in the Iran–Iraq War and the Persian Gulf War by hundreds of civilians. According to the U.S. military, the shelter at Amiriyah had been targeted because it fit the profile of a military command center; electronic signals from the locality had been reported as coming from the site, and spy satellites had observed people and vehicles moving in, and out of the shelter.

Charles E. Allen, the CIA's National Intelligence Officer for Warning, supported the selection of bomb targets during the Persian Gulf War. He coordinated intelligence with Colonel John Warden, who headed the U.S. Air Force's planning cell known as "Checkmate". On 10 February 1991, Allen presented his estimate to Colonel Warden that Public Shelter Number 25 in the southwestern Baghdad suburb of Amiriyah had become an alternative command post and showed no sign of being used as a civilian bomb shelter. However, Human Rights Watch noted in 1991, "It is now well established, through interviews with neighborhood residents, that the Ameriyya structure was plainly marked as a public shelter and was used throughout the air war by large numbers of civilians".

A former United States Air Force general who worked as "the senior targeting officer for the Royal Saudi Air Force", an "impeccable source" according to Robert Fisk, said in the aftermath of the bombing that "[Richard I.] Neal talked about camouflage on the roof of the bunker. But I am not of the belief that any of the bunkers around Baghdad have camouflage on them. There is said to have been barbed wire there but that's normal in Baghdad... There's not a single soul in the American military who believes that this was a command-and-control bunker... We thought it was a military personnel bunker. Any military bunker is assumed to have some civilians in it. We have attacked bunkers where we assume there are women and children who are members of the families of military personnel who are allowed in the military bunkers".

Satellite photos and electronic intercepts indicating this alternative use as a command and control center were regarded as circumstantial and unconvincing to Brigadier General Buster Glosson, who had primary responsibility for targeting. Glosson commented that the assessment wasn't "worth a shit". On 11 February, Shelter Number 25 was added to the USAF's attack plan.

Bombing
At 04:30 on the morning of 13 February, two F-117 stealth bombers each dropped a  GBU-27 laser-guided bomb on the shelter. The first bomb cut through  of reinforced concrete before a time-delayed fuse exploded. Minutes later, the second bomb followed the path cut by the first bomb. Neighborhood residents heard screams as people tried to get out of the shelter. They screamed for four minutes. After the second bomb hit, the screaming ceased.

At the time of the bombing, hundreds of Iraqi civilians, mostly women and children, were sheltering in the building; many were sleeping. More than 1,500 people were killed; reports on precise numbers vary, and the registration book was incinerated in the blast. People staying on the upper level were incinerated by heat while boiling water from the shelter's water tank was responsible for the rest of the fatalities. Not all killed died immediately; black, incinerated handprints of some victims remained fused to the concrete ceiling of the shelter. The blast sent shrapnel into surrounding buildings, shattering glass windows and splintering their foundations.

Reactions
Many foreign governments responded to the bombing at Amiriyah with mourning, outrage, and calls for investigations. Jordan declared three days of mourning. Algerian and Sudanese governing parties condemned the bombing as a "paroxysm of terror and barbarism" and a "hideous, bloody massacre" respectively. Jordan and Spain called for an international inquiry into the bombing, and Spain urged the U.S. to move its attacks away from Iraq itself and concentrate instead on occupied Kuwait.

Legacy

Memorial 
The shelter is currently maintained as it was after the blast, as a memorial to those who died within it, featuring photos of those killed. According to visitors' reports, Umm Greyda, a woman who lost eight children in the bombing, moved into the shelter to help create the memorial and serves as its primary guide.

Subsequent debate
Jeremy Bowen, a BBC correspondent, was one of the first reporters on the scene. Bowen was given access to the site and found no evidence of military use.

The White House, in a report titled Apparatus of Lies: Crafting Tragedy, states that U.S. intelligence sources reported the shelter was being used for military command purposes. The report goes on to accuse the Iraqi government of deliberately keeping "select civilians" in a military facility at Amiriyah.

Legality
Seven Iraqi families living in Belgium who lost relatives in the bombing launched a lawsuit against former President George H. W. Bush, former Secretary of Defense Dick Cheney, former Chairman of the Joint Chiefs of Staff Colin Powell, and General Norman Schwarzkopf for committing what they claim were war crimes in the 1991 bombing. The suit was brought under Belgium's universal jurisdiction guarantees in March 2003 but was dismissed in September following their restriction to Belgian nationals and residents in August 2003.

In culture

A character from the play Nine Parts of Desire, Umm Gheda, is a caretaker of the bombed shelter.

Thom Yorke of Radiohead wrote the song "I Will" about the bombing, which was published on the band's sixth studio album Hail to the Thief.

A short film by the poet Robert Minhinnick, Black Hands, features his poem of the same name and footage of the shelter.

Naseer Shamma, an Iraqi Oud player, has composed a solo Oud piece, "Happened at al-Amiriyya", which is a musical description of the event.

In the documentary Homeland: Iraq Year Zero, the shelter, since converted to a memorial, is toured by the director's family in the days before the 2003 invasion.

Notes

References

Further reading
 Boustany, Nora (The Washington Post Foreign Service). "Bombs Killed Victims as They Slept". The Washington Post. Thursday, 14 February 1991. p. A01.

External links
The Battle for Hearts and Minds, (The Washington Post, 1998)
 Image of the damaged roof and floor.
 External view of the shelter.
 Image of Amiriyah Bombing Aftermath.

1991 in Iraq
February 1991 events in Asia
Airstrikes conducted by the United States
Gulf War
20th century in Baghdad
Iraq–United States relations
United States military scandals
Mass murder in 1991
Massacres in 1991
Massacres in Iraq
Mass murder in Iraq
Massacres committed by the United States
Aerial operations and battles of the Gulf War
United States war crimes
Airstrikes in Iraq